Alopecosa exasperans is a species of wolf spider in the family Lycosidae. It is found in Canada and Greenland.

References

exasperans
Articles created by Qbugbot
Spiders described in 1877